Slydris is an iOS game developed by American studio Radiangames and released on July 26, 2012.

Gameplay
Unlike Tetris, where players have to arrange pieces that fall onto the screen, in Slydris players have to instead manipulate shapes of 2 colours to try to get an entire line being the same colour. They will then disappear and the player will earn points.

Critical reception
The game has a Metacritic of 86% based on 6 critic reviews.

Modojo said "An enormous amount of pre-planning is required to set up that perfect chain-reaction, and the intense excitement that accompanies the successful realization of your careful strategizing is both hypnotic and thrilling. " Gamezebo said "It takes the basic little line clearing puzzle set-up and tweaks it just enough to give it a fresh feeling to make it feel new all over again. Not going to set the world on fire but definitely worth a look for friends of the genre. " AppSmile wrote "A departure for the dev team, Slydris is a relaxing yet challenging experience that appeals to a much wider audience than previous dual-stick releases. " PocketGamerUK wrote "An engaging, neon-bright puzzler, Slydris plays with the building blocks of the best and comes up with something pretty damn good. " TouchArcade wrote "iPad Gamers that embrace the style will easily find Slydris to be an excellent block puzzler with very little to complain about. Genre novices should also enjoy the game as its highly approachable gameplay and inviting feel is universally appealing. If you're looking for a new puzzle title to relax and kill time with, look no further. " Digital Spy said "For a more traditional challenge there is also the survival mode, which drops blocks at timed intervals for a fast-paced challenge. It all plays fantastically on the iPad, and makes for a unique twist puzzle fanatics will enjoy. " 148Apps wrote "It is difficult to tell what each of the special blocks is designed to do just based on a quick glimpse of what each one is. Suddenly there's some block that's just advancing upward and I have no clue where it is or what it's doing. Some kind of better indicator besides what currently exists would be helpful. "

References

2012 video games
Android (operating system) games
IOS games
Puzzle video games
Video games developed in the United States